Rocky Point is a coastal rural locality in the Shire of Douglas, Queensland, Australia.

Geography 

The Coral Sea forms the eastern boundary, and Saltwater Creek the southern.

Dayman Point (also known as Rocky Point) is a coastal headland and the easternmost part of the locality. It is named after Lieutenant Joseph Dayman of the Royal Navy who served on the survey ship HMS Rattlesnake from 1847 to 1848 during its exploration of northern Australia.

History 
Rocky Point State School opened on 23 February 1939. The school was at 14 Rocky Point School Road. Most of the Rocky Point school buildings were sold for housing, but one was relocated to Wonga Beach.

Education 
There are no schools in Rocky Point. The nearest government primary schools are Miallo State School in neighbouring Miallo to the west and Wonga Beach State School in neighbouring Wonga Beach to the north. The nearest government secondary school is Mossman State High School in Mossman to the south-west.

Amenities 
There is a breakwater and boat ramp on Mossman Daintree Road . They are managed by the Douglas Shire Council.

References 

Shire of Douglas
Coastline of Queensland
Localities in Queensland